The Gift: Imagination and the Erotic Life of Property is a 1983 book by Lewis Hyde, in which the author examines the importance of gifts, their flow and movement and the impact that the modern market place has had on the circulation of gifts.

Part of part I, "A Theory of Gifts", was originally published as "The Gift Must Always Move" in Co-Evolution Quarterly No. 35 in fall 1982.

Other editions and translations 
The book has been republished with alternative subtitles,. A 2006 printing appeared with the subtitle "How the Creative Spirit Transforms the World" and a 2007 printing as "Creativity and the Artist in the Modern World". The twenty-fifth anniversary 2007 edition contains a new preface and  afterword.

It has been translated into Italian (2005), German (2008), Chinese (2008), Japanese (2002) and Turkish (2007).

References

External links 
The Gift at Lewis Hyde's web page with comments, reviews and excerpt

1983 non-fiction books
Books about creativity
English-language books
Works about intellectual property law
Works about the information economy